Phil Gwatkin (5 August 1929 – 9 July 2006) was an English footballer, who played as a winger in the Football League for Wrexham and Tranmere Rovers.

References

External links

Tranmere Rovers F.C. players
Wrexham A.F.C. players
Northwich Victoria F.C. players
Association football wingers
English Football League players
1929 births
2006 deaths
English footballers